Lote tree may refer to:

 Ziziphus spina-christi, Ziziphus lotus or Ziziphus jujuba, Mediterranean trees in the buckthorn family Rhamnaceae
 Sidrat al-Muntaha, a lote tree mentioned in the Quran
 Celtis australis, a European tree in the family Cannabaceae

See also

 Lotebush or Ziziphus obtusifolia, a species of flowering plant in the buckthorn family, native to the Americas